Todd Birr (born April 20, 1968) is an American curler. He was a bronze medalist at the 2007 World Men's Curling Championship.

Career
Birr skipped his team to victory at the 2007 United States Curling Men's Championships, beating out teams such as Olympic bronze medalist Pete Fenson and former national champion Jason Larway in the process. He had relative success in prior nationals finishing fourth in 2006 and as a semi-finalist in 2004.

His victory qualified his team of Bill Todhunter, Greg Johnson and Kevin Birr to a berth at the 2007 Ford World Men's Curling Championship representing team USA. There, Birr's was the only team to defeat Glenn Howard's Canadian team in the round robin when Howard wrecked on his last rock, and Birr bumped out a Canadian stone to score three giving him a victory. USA finished second behind Canada going into the playoffs. However, in the playoffs Birr lost 7–2 to Canada in the 1 vs 2 page playoff game, and then lost in the semi-final to Germany's Andy Kapp rink by a score of 6–4 earning Birr and the rest of team USA a bronze medal.

In 2009, Birr skipped the U.S. team to a three game sweep over the Brazilian national team at the first ever Americas Challenge to determine the second American berth at the 2009 Ford World Men's Curling Championship.

Birr works as icemaker at The Four Seasons Curling Club in Blaine, Minnesota.

Teams

References

External links

 

1968 births
Living people
Sportspeople from Mankato, Minnesota
American male curlers
American curling champions
Continental Cup of Curling participants
Curling ice makers